Aequorea is a genus of pelagic hydrozoans in the family Aequoreidae.

Species
The genus contains the following species:
Aequorea africana Millard, 1966
Aequorea albida L. Agassiz, 1862
Aequorea atrikeelis Lin, Xu, Huang & Wang, 2009
Aequorea australis Uchida, 1947
Aequorea coerulescens (Brandt, 1838)
Aequorea conica Browne, 1905
Aequorea cyanea de Blainville, 1834
Aequorea floridana Agassiz, 1862
Aequorea forskalea Péron & Lesueur, 1810
Aequorea globosa Eschscholtz, 1829
Aequorea krampi Bouillon, 1984
Aequorea kurangai Gershwin, Zeidler & Davie, 2010
Aequorea macrodactyla Brandt, 1835
Aequorea minima Bouillon, 1985
Aequorea nanhainensis Xu, Huang & Du, 2009
Aequorea papillata Huang & Xu, 1994
Aequorea parva Browne, 1905
Aequorea pensilis Haeckel, 1879
Aequorea phillipensis Watson, 1998
Aequorea taiwanensis Zheng, Lin, Li, Cao, Xu & Huang, 2009
Aequorea tenuis Agassiz, 1862
Aequorea tetranema Xu, Huang & Du, 2009
Aequorea victoria Murbach & Shearer, 1902
Aequorea vitrina Gosse, 1853

References

Aequoreidae
Hydrozoan genera
Bioluminescent cnidarians